Man In Space Soonest (MISS) was a United States Air Force (USAF) program to put a man into outer space before the Soviet Union. The program was cancelled on August 1, 1958, and was replaced by NASA's Project Mercury. Only two men from the program would actually reach outer space. The first, Joseph A. Walker, did so two or three times (depending on the definition of the space border) in X-15 rocket plane tests in 1963. The other, Neil Armstrong, became a NASA astronaut in 1962, flew on Gemini 8 in 1966, and in 1969 on Apollo 11 becoming the first person to walk on the Moon.

Astronaut candidates 

MISS would have used a Thor booster, then later an Atlas, to launch a single-man spacecraft into orbit. On June 25, 1958, the Air Force announced the following nine men selected to be astronauts for the program:

 Neil A. Armstrong (1930–2012), 27, NACA. The only member of the group to join the NASA Astronaut Corps. Flew on Gemini 8 and Apollo 11 missions; performed the first docking of two spacecraft, was the first—along with Buzz Aldrin—to land on the Moon, and was the first person to set foot on the Moon.
 William B. Bridgeman (1916–1968), 42, Douglas Aircraft Company
 A. Scott Crossfield (1921–2006), 36, North American Aviation (NAA)
 Iven C. Kincheloe (1928–1958), 29, USAF
 John B. McKay (1922–1975), 35, NACA
 Robert A. Rushworth (1924–1993), 33, USAF
 Joseph A. Walker (1921–1966), 37, NACA. The first member of the group to achieve outer space according to the FAI, and to enter space twice, on two X-15 test flights.
 Alvin S. White (1918–2006), 39, NAA 
 Robert M. White (1924–2010), 33, USAF. The first member of the group to achieve outer space according to the USAF.

See also
 List of astronauts by selection
 Project Mercury
 Vostok Program

References

External links

 Encyclopedia Astronautica entry.
 

Abandoned military projects of the United States
Human spaceflight
Neil Armstrong
Proposed spacecraft
1958 in spaceflight
1958 in the United States